Trevor Grimshaw (1947 in Hyde, Cheshire – 2001) was an English artist whose main subject is the northern industrial town landscape as it used to be.

Life and work
Grimshaw was born in Hyde, Cheshire in 1947 and studied at the Stockport College of Art from 1963 to 1968. He developed a unique style working in oils, charcoal and graphite to produce atmospheric, stylised images of the Northern industrial landscape, mainly in monochrome.

As a child he had a passion for steam engines and trainspotting, which continued into adulthood; for example he made the journey to the scrapyard at Barry in South Wales which held hundreds of steam locomotives awaiting scrapping, and made a personal photographic record of the occasion, 34 photo images being used in his publication "Stilled Life". Much of his work overall features steam engines.

He spent much of his working career at Manchester advertising agency Stowe Bowden Ltd.

Artistic career
Grimshaw exhibited widely in the UK (including at the Royal Scottish Academy and the Royal Academy in the 1970s) and in the US and Germany. His work was included in the private collections of L.S. Lowry, Edward Heath (two drawings purchased in 1973), the Warburton (Bread) Family and Gerald Kaufman MP., and he is represented in a number of public collections, including The Tate Gallery, Salford Art Gallery, Stockport Art Gallery and Bury Art Gallery.

He illustrated The Singing Street, a book of poems by Mike Harding, and executed limited edition lithographs for Christie's Contemporary Art. He also collborated with composer Peter McGarr in 'Echoes and Reflections' at Cornerhouse Gallery, Manchester and did the title slide images for the early BBC Great Railway Journeys of the World series. Artist Geoffrey Key described Grimshaw, a long time friend, as "one of the most important graphic artists working in the north during the last half of the 20th century".

While Grimshaw is most celebrated for his black and grey graphite portrayal of post-industrial Britain (e.g. canals, cityscapes, viaducts, steam trains) his portfolio included diverse other subjects such as megaliths, Stonehenge, quarries in North Wales, motorway construction and the solstices (often in combination). Colour treatment was largely reserved for Cheshire landscapes, and pictures of Clarice Cliff ceramics.

L.S.Lowry attended one of his earliest exhibitions, buying three of his major early works to hang alongside his small collection of Pre-Raphaelites. Grimshaw became a regular visitor to Lowry’s home in Mottram.

In 1973 the North West Arts Association published Townscape: Trevor Grimshaw, a book reproducing 30 drawings.
In 2004 a major retrospective exhibition was held at Stockport Art Gallery.

In December 2011 viewers of the BBC programme "Flog It!" witnessed two large graphite drawings sell for £3,200 and £3,800 (plus buyer's premium) at an auction held at Adam Partridge's auction rooms in Congleton.

Final exhibitions and death
By the time of his death, in a house fire in November 2001, Grimshaw had become an alcoholic and a reclusive figure. He held his last show in 1997 in the County Museum and Art Gallery at Prostejov, Moravia, Czech Republic, his 50th show in his 50th year.

Grimshaw's daughter organised a retrospective exhibition of her father's work, which took place from February to May 2004 at Stockport Art Gallery.

Ceridwen Grimshaw (Trevor's youngest daughter) recently discovered negatives taken from Grimshaw's 1970's 3 trips to Woodham's Barry Scrapyard in South Wales (see above). Almost 100 of these images were unused and 90 were exhibited at Stockport War Museum and Art Gallery from 11 May 2019 to June 15, 2019 titled "Trevor Grimshaw - Unseen Barry Photographs". Grimshaw's intention was to show the effects of Barry's salt air on over 100 steam locomotives awaiting scrapping (although most were eventually saved).
A further showing of this exhibition is planned for later 2021 at the Upfront Gallery near Penrith, alongside oiher railway artists. Date TBC, please refer to website https://up-front.com/gallery/ for further information.

A book showing 47 of the photographs titled Trevor Grimshaw - Unseen Barry Photographs written by former work colleagues the late Frank Dixon and John Keith, and fellow artist Martin Dobson (who accompanied Grimshaw on 2 of his Barry trips) was published in 2019.
An Exhibition of Grimshaw's Barry (South Wales) Photographs shown at the Up-front Gallery in the village of Unthank near Penrith in Cumbria 11 July until 8 August 2021; The photographs show the corroding effects of sea air on the hundred plus steam locomotives parked at Woodham's scrapyard awaiting scrapping, most to be eventually saved.

Messum's St. James London Gallery achieved the highest price to date (£10k) for a Grimshaw at their Elemental North Exhibition in 2014 (see https://www.messums.com/exhibitions/view/423).

References

Trevor Grimshaw Retrospective Catalogue 2004
Harry Rutherford Exhibition Ashton-under-Lyne Catalogue circa 2003
Adolphe Valette Exhibition catalogue Manchester City Art Galleries

External links
 Review of 2004 exhibition 

English artists
2001 deaths
1947 births
People from Hyde, Greater Manchester